The Randolph County School District is a public school district in Randolph County, Georgia. United States, based in Cuthbert. It serves the communities of Coleman, Cuthbert, and Shellman.

Schools
The Randolph County School District has one elementary school, one middle school, and one high school.
Randolph County Elementary School
Randolph Clay Middle School
Randolph Clay High School

References

External links

School districts in Georgia (U.S. state)
Education in Randolph County, Georgia